The Chery QQme (codeproject S16) is a city car produced by the Chinese manufacturer Chery Automobile from 2009 to 2011.

Overview

Chery created a QQ-branded product line in 2006 that included the original QQ (rebadged as a QQ3), a sedan version called Chery QQ6 and the three door Chery QQme. Prices of the QQme in early 2012 ranged from 55,000 yuan to 69,000 yuan with sales per year ranging from a few hundreds up to just above a thousand units.

References

External links 

  

QQme
City cars
Cars of China
Cars introduced in 2009
2010s cars